The 2017 MFF Cup is the tenth edition of the MFF Cup, the knockout football tournament in Mongolia.

It is sponsored by Arvain Undes. 30 teams were accepted into the tournament. It began with the 1st Round in 2017.

Mongolian Premier League side Erchim were the defending champions.

Teams

First round
Results:

Second round

Quarter-finals

Semi-finals

Final

See also
2017 Mongolian Premier League

References

External links
Mongolian Football Federation Facebook page

Football competitions in Mongolia
Mongolia
Cup